Academic visibility relates to the dissemination, accessibility, and recognition of scholarship produced by college faculty, especially in terms of promotion and tenure criteria and academic rank. Traditionally, "visibility" was a function of printed output like books, book chapters, and peer-reviewed journal articles primarily available in academic libraries. This is rapidly changing with the exponential increase in electronic, online indexing of these materials. Scholarly recognition and reputation increases as visibility increases from works being frequently referred to as authoritative.

Role in tenure promotion

For college professors, the promotion and tenure process takes into account the achievements and reputation of their scholarly activities. Having a national (and international) reputation means that their academic publishing has been disseminated widely and is frequently cited by other scholars. Promotion and tenure typically requires demonstrating a strong record of published research, instruction, and professional/administrative service, with the strongest emphasis on research in many universities.

Tenure-track faculty start in the academic rank of Assistant Professor. They need to establish a strong scholarly reputation prior to being promoted to Associate Professor.  Among other things, this involves publishing working in respected outlets, presenting their work at academic or professional conferences, and being of service to their profession and/or community.  Traditionally, promotion and tenure decisions have been strongly influenced by a professor's scholarly work - which includes books, book chapters, and refereed journal articles. Books, book chapters, and journal articles have been the easiest types of scholarly output to assess because they existed in hard-copy and were mostly peer-reviewed, professionally published, and indexed by libraries. These, however, only represent one of three categories used to assess achievements and reputation with the others being teaching and service. Not being promoted upon tenure review frequently results in dismissal (i.e., termination).

Importance of internet

Information and communications technologies are rapidly changing how academic achievements and reputation can be assessed. The internet is becoming an all-purpose source for scholarship. "Web mentions" and URL citations are an analog to journal citations for scholarly work appearing or referenced on web sites or blogs. Like article citations, web citations can represent the noteworthiness of a scholar's contributions. And like frequent academic journal citations, a wide range of web mentions adds to an academic's reputation and prestige.

The advantage of assessing a wider range of academic output conveys the breadth and reach takes a more holistic view of an academic's body of work, or figuratively, an overall "academic footprint". An assessment of the academic footprint and/or visibility approaches that of the actual tenure review process because it can include nearly all of the activities undertaken by a faculty member, including but not limited to: dissertation, book reviews, conference proceedings, conference presentations, research reports, funded grants, and teaching activities.

Webometrics can be used to assess an academic's visibility based on "web mentions" or references to academic work by web pages. Metrics include number of URLs, Google Pagerank, and number of sources linking to associated pages (backlinks).

References

Further reading 
 Laredo, P., & Mustar, P. (2000). Laboratory activity profiles: An exploratory approach. Scientometrics, 47(3), 515–539.
 Mangematin, V., & Mandran, N. (2000). PhD job market: professional trajectories and incentives during the PhD. Research policy, 29(6), 741–756.

Academic culture